Veneration may refer to:

Religion
Veneration of the dead
Veneration of Mary in the Catholic Church
Veneration of saints
Veneration of relics

Other